Bonifacio may refer to:

Places
 Bonifacio, Corse-du-Sud, a town in Corsica, France
 Strait of Bonifacio, separating Corsica from Sardinia
 Bonifacio, Misamis Occidental, a municipality in the Philippines
 Bonifacio Global City, a central business district in Metro Manila, Philippines
 Fort Bonifacio, an army camp in Metro Manila, Philippines
 Liwasang Bonifacio, a public square in Manila, Philippines
 Bonifacio Drive, a major road in Manila, Philippines

Other uses
 Bonifacio (name), including a list of people with the name
 Bonifacio Transport Corporation, an intercity bus company in the Philippines
 Bonifacio: Ang Unang Pangulo, a 2014 Philippine historical drama film

See also
 San Bonifacio, Verona, Italy, a commune
 São Bonifácio, Santa Catarina, Brazil, a municipality
 Boniface (name)
 Saint Boniface (disambiguation)